Ruurd is a given name. Notable people with the given name include:

 Ruurd Dirk Hoogland (1922–1994), Dutch explorer
 Ruurd Leegstra (1877–1933), Dutch rower and Olympian

See also
 Ruud

Dutch masculine given names